The Witch's Curse is a 1962 peplum-fantasy film, directed by Riccardo Freda.

Plot
In the mid-1500s, a witch is burned in Scotland and places a curse on the inhabitants before she dies.  One hundred years later, the tree she was chained to and burned still stands with no one daring to destroy it.  The curse remains by forcing women to commit suicide.  The witch's descendant, Martha Gunt, is sentenced to be burned for witchcraft.

As she is placed in a prison cell, Maciste comes forth to fight evil.  When he uproots the cursed tree, he finds an entrance to Hell where he attempts to track down the original witch to rescind her curse and attempts to help the damned from their plight.

Cast
 Kirk Morris as Maciste
 Hélène Chanel as Fania
 Vira Silenti as Martha Gaunt
 Andrea Bosic as Judge Parrish
 Charles Fernley Fawcett as the Doctor
 Remo De Angelis as Prometheus
 John Karlsen
 Gina Mascetti
 Puccio Ceccarelli

Production
The Castellana caves  which still serve as a tourist attraction, were used for the underground scenes. The sequences set in the Hell were entirely filmed in the Castellana Caves, in the province of Bari. Maciste, the leading character, was turned during the filming into an almost mute character as Freda was very unhappy with the acting skills of the main actor Kirk Morris. The film is referred as "an interpretation of mythology cum the gothic horror genre".

Release
The Witch's Curse was released in Italy on April 11, 1962. It grossed a total of 277 million Italian lire domestically in Italy.

References

Footnotes

Sources

External links
 
 

1960s fantasy films
Italian fantasy films
Peplum films
Films directed by Riccardo Freda
Films set in Scotland
Films about curses
Films about witchcraft
Maciste films
Remakes of Italian films
Sound film remakes of silent films
Sword and sandal films
1960s Italian films